Sons and Fascination/Sister Feelings Call is the (double-LP) fourth album by Scottish post-punk band Simple Minds. It was released in September 1981 and was their first to reach a wide international audience. It includes the singles "The American", "Love Song" and "Sweat in Bullet".

Overview
Sons and Fascination and Sister Feelings Call were two separate albums. They were assembled from the same sessions and released at the same time and, in some instances, sold as a double-LP set. The two releases are variously categorised as a double album, two single albums or a single album and an extended play. The current CD remaster contains all the tracks once split onto two LPs, with their respective track running orders preserved. The original 1985 CD reissue deleted two songs from Sister Feelings Call, "League of Nations" and "Sound in 70 Cities", as the maximum running time of Red Book CD releases at the time would not accommodate the entire set, and Virgin were unwilling to issue the material as a two-CD set.

Recording
The sessions are the last to have the same line-up as all its predecessors. Drummer Brian McGee left just after recording the set, and was replaced by Kenny Hyslop as part-time member for the upcoming tour. Hyslop also appeared in the "Sweat in Bullet" and "Love Song" videos.

Having ended their contract with Arista the sessions were the first recordings the band made for Virgin Records. They worked with producer Steve Hillage, who was a guitarist in the progressive rock band Gong. One thing Hillage and Simple Minds had in common was a love of krautrock music. The band's previous three albums were produced by John Leckie.

The rhythm section was made more prominent than on any earlier album of the band, loud, heavy and sometimes anchoring a track to one or two driving rhythm patterns, but also often put at moving angles with some of the other instruments or with Jim Kerr's vocals (as in "The American" or "Sweat in Bullet"); this gave the songs a spatial, multi-planed and atmospheric sound, whilst keeping up propulsion.

The band recorded fifteen backing tracks for the album but could not decide which tracks to keep, and therefore started to talk about making a double album. During the hectic recording sessions the band exhausted their budget and the work on some tracks was unfinished. Kerr later said: "In retrospect I think we tried to achieve the impossible. We wanted to record a double album on the budget of a single one. But at that moment, we were so full of ideas, and we thought they were all useful. So we decided to record everything and ended up with a huge mess, a veritable nightmare". Unwilling to scrap some of the songs they decided to release all the material as a limited edition double set.

"The American" was the first song completed during the recording sessions and quickly released as a single in May 1981. The song was inspired by the bright colours of an exhibition of modern American art Kerr had seen.

"Love Song" was recorded and released as a single a month before the still uncompleted album was released. The B-side "This Earth That You Walk Upon" is an instrumental track originating from a studio jam by Mick MacNeil. After the release of the single the band decided to add lyrics to the song and included the new vocal version on the album.

"Boys from Brazil" is inspired by the novel The Boys from Brazil, as Kerr has said in interviews. The line "babies cannot manage crocodiles" is likely inspired by the Lewis Carroll logic puzzle: "All babies are illogical / Nobody is despised who can manage a crocodile / Illogical persons are despised".

Releases

Viewed as vinyl LPs, Sons and Fascination is the fourth Simple Minds album, with Sister Feelings Call being the fifth one. Or their double-LP fourth album. Indeed, the two were released simultaneously in 1981, Sons and Fascination being the main feature, and Sister Feelings Call included as a bonus disc with the first 10,000 copies of the original release. It reached number 11 on the UK Albums Chart, number 31 on the Australian Kent Music Report chart, number 46 on the Canadian RPM National Top 50 Albums Chart, number seven on the New Zealand RIANZ chart and number four on the Swedish Sverigetopplistan chart. In 1986, the album was certified gold by the British Phonographic Industry.

The restructured Canadian version of the Sons and Fascination album (expanded to ten tracks, six of the eight on the UK release and a further four taken from Sister Feelings Call, there shortened to five tracks on the vinyl release and six tracks on cassette) had a significantly different running order, beginning with "Love Song".

Upon its first CD release in 1985, Sons and Fascination came with five of the seven tracks from Sister Feelings Call added directly after the main set, so that the CD played as a single long album. As two tracks from "Sister Feelings Call" had been dropped due to the technical limitations of Compact Discs at the time (the disc's running length having to fit within 74 minutes), the album was therefore not complete. No indication was given on the inserts or the disc that the latter five tracks were from "Sister Feelings Call". The dropped tracks included "League of Nations" and "Sound in 70 Cities" (an instrumental version of Sons and Fascinations "70 Cities as Love Brings the Fall"), both of which later appeared on the CD single of the 12-inch cut of "The American" and would re-appear in album form in 2002 and 2003 when remasters of the double set were issued under the title Sons and Fascination/Sister Feelings Call.

In 2012, Virgin Records released the X5 CD box set containing the band's first five albums, each containing extra tracks. This could be considered to contain the definitive version of the album(s), collecting all the tracks spread across the various releases to date.

 Singles 

"The American", "Love Song" and "Sweat in Bullet" were released as singles. "The American" preceded the album and became the group's first charting single in the UK since "Life in a Day" in 1979 reaching number 59.

"Love Song" followed and charted slightly higher at No. 47 in the UK. "Love Song" proved to be the first breakout hit for the group charting across several countries. It was a Top 20 hit in Sweden and Australia.

"Sweat in Bullet" was remixed for single release by Peter Walsh. The single reached number 52 in the UK, number 47 in New Zealand and number 17 in Sweden. Walsh went on to produce the band's following album New Gold Dream (81/82/83/84) in 1982.

 Critical reception 

Reviewing Sons and Fascination/Sister Feelings Call for The Face, Ian Cranna praised the album as "mostly first-rate stuff" and noted that "if Jim Kerr's lyrics have taken a turn for the more obscure then the moving hesitancy of his delivery communicates the urgency of the message powerfully enough." Mark Cooper of Record Mirror said that it "confirms the promise of Empires and Dance", while John Gill of Sounds wrote, "Experience has brought further subjects within their vision; quite literally, from angels to nazis. They have the guts, the drive, the rhythm-poetry-inspiration to do it and say it." Less receptive was NME critic Chris Bohn, who deemed the album "excessively and inexcusably laboured." Sons and Fascination/Sister Feelings Call was ranked by Sounds as the 18th best album of 1981. The listeners of Toronto-area alternative radio station CFNY-FM voted it the best album of 1981 (in a tie with King Crimson's Discipline).

The album's legacy was further strengthened in retrospective critic listings; a 2007 issue of Mojo magazine listed Sons and Fascination/Sister Feelings Call as one of the 80 greatest albums of the 1980s, while The Guardian selected the record as one of the "1000 Albums to Hear Before You Die", writing, "Before they descended into epic pomp-rock bluster, Simple Minds were purveyors of supremely romantic, slyly futuristic synthpop. Sons and Fascination found them cannily mining a seam of mesmerising, shimmering art-rock, while tracks like 'Love Song' were so gorgeously lustrous that you could even forgive them their future." In The Essential Rock Discography (2006), Martin C. Strong rated Sons and Fascination/Sister Feelings Call highly and wrote: "Simple Minds were beginning to find their niche, incorporating their artier tendencies into more conventional and melodic song structures."

 Track listing 

 Sons and FascinationSister Feelings CallThe Canadian versions of both Sons and Fascination and Sister Feelings Call contained respectively tracklists and running orders differing from the original versions, with Sons removing two tracks ("70 Cities as Love Brings the Fall" and "Seeing out the Angel") from the original and adding four ("Theme for Great Cities", "The American", "20th Century Promised Land" and "League of Nations") from Sister. Sons thus contained ten rather than eight tracks, and Sister five rather than seven tracks.

 Sons and Fascination (Canadian version)Sister Feelings Call (Canadian version)Sons and Fascination/Sister Feelings Call''The 2002 remastered reissue includes all titles from both albums. It was also released in heavy duty gatefold picture card sleeve with black inner sleeve. The original 1985 CD omits "League of Nations" and "Sound in 70 Cities" due to space constraints.

Personnel
Adapted from the album's liner notes.Simple Minds Jim Kerr – voice
 Charlie Burchill – guitars
 Mick MacNeil – keyboards
 Derek Forbes – basses
 Brian McGee – drumsAdditional personnel Ken Lockie – backing vocals
 Jaqui – backing vocalsTechnical'''
 Steve Hillage – producer
 Hugh Jones – engineer (Farmyard Studios)
 Alan Jakoby – engineer (Regents Park Studios)
 Malcolm Garrett, Assorted iMaGes – design, direction 
 Sheila Rock – photography

Charts

Certifications

References

External links
 
 
 

1981 albums
Simple Minds albums
Albums produced by Steve Hillage
Virgin Records albums